This is a list of presidents of the National Assembly of Gabon, who is the presiding officer of National Assembly of Gabon.

Sources
 Official website of the National Assembly of Gabon (in French)

Politics of Gabon
Gabon, National Assembly
 
presidents of the National Assembly